The 1962–63 William & Mary Indians men's basketball team represented the College of William & Mary in intercollegiate basketball during the 1962–63 NCAA University Division men's basketball season. Under the sixth year of head coach Bill Chambers, the team finished the season 15–9 and 10–5 in the Southern Conference.

William & Mary played most of its home games on campus at Blow Gymnasium, with one home game played off campus at the Norfolk Municipal Auditorium in Norfolk, Virginia. This was the 58th season of the collegiate basketball program at William & Mary, whose nickname is now the Tribe.

The Indians finished in 3rd place in the conference and qualified for the 1963 Southern Conference men's basketball tournament, held at the Richmond Arena. Third-seeded William & Mary, however, fell to sixth-seeded VPI in the first round.

The Indians did not participate in a post-season tournament.

Schedule

|-
!colspan=9 style="background:#006400; color:#FFD700;"| Regular season

|-
!colspan=9 style="background:#006400; color:#FFD700;"| 1963 Southern Conference Basketball Tournament

Source

References

William & Mary Tribe men's basketball seasons
William and Mary
William and Mary
William and Mary